Orme may refer to:

Places

United Kingdom 

 Great Orme and Little Orme, two headlands overlooking Llandudno Bay in Wales

United States 
 Orme, Maryland, an unincorporated community in Prince George's County
 Orme, Tennessee, a town in Marion County
 The Orme School of Arizona, a private school in Mayer, Arizona

Quebec (Canada) 
 Rivière aux Ormes, in Lotbinière Regional County Municipality, Chaudière-Appalaches
 Rivière à l'Orme, a tributary of lac des Deux Montagnes on Montreal Island

Other uses
 Orme (name), with a list of people named Orme
 Orme's Law, a rule for assessing power requirements for radio controlled models
 Le Orme, an Italian progressive rock band
 Orme (horse), a Thoroughbred racehorse

See also
 Orm (disambiguation)
 Ormes (disambiguation)
 Guernsey Elm